A private island is a disconnected body of land wholly owned by a private citizen or corporation. Although this exclusivity gives the owner substantial control over the property, private islands remain under the jurisdiction of national and sometimes local governments. Their size vary widely, from that of a typical suburban yard to several hundred square kilometers.

Ownership

Virtually all islands in the world are claimed and governed by some national government. That nation's laws apply, and any attempt by the owner to claim sovereignty would generally be unrealistic. Nevertheless, some people still try to set up their own micronations on islands, like real-estate millionaire Michael Oliver's attempt at building a libertarian city-state called the Republic of Minerva in the southern Pacific Ocean. There are widely varying government policies regarding private islands: for instance, islands off the coast of China, like any other land within the country, cannot be purchased outright, but only leased from the government for a maximum period of 50 years.

"Private" islands in the United Kingdom, Brazil, Chile and some other countries are not legally entirely privateany foreshore, such as a beach, is owned by the government, and is hence publicly accessible property, despite what the owners of the land on the island may wish to claim. The same applies to freedom to roam in Nordic countries: only the yard of a house and the immediate vicinity is legally protected against trespassing, and the water bodies around the island are freely navigable.

There are many thousands of uninhabited islands in the world with potential for commercial development of tourist resorts or private recreational use. Some islands can be bought undeveloped, while others already have roads and/or houses. Islands are also available for rent. Many celebrities have their own private islands.

Commercial development of uninhabited islands can raise ecological concerns, as many have a fragile environment.

Cruise lines
Since 1992 a number of cruise lines have acquired "private islands" to offer their customers exclusive beach experiences. Such islands (or sections thereof) were further developed to have restaurants and perhaps additional attractions such as parasailing, waterparks, zip lines, horseback riding, spas and more. Some islands have piers, others are reached by tender. The purchase of an island allows the cruise line to achieve greater control over the venue and to influence the quality of experience of their passengers. Certain private islands may be used not only by the cruise line that bought the property but also by associated lines.

List of "private islands" of cruise lines
 Castaway Cay, owner Disney Cruise Line, pier access
 Labadee, Haiti, a peninsula, Royal Caribbean International,  pier access
 Great Stirrup Cay, Bahamas, Norwegian Cruise Line
 Little Stirrup Cay (Coco Cay), Bahamas, Royal Caribbean International, pier access
 Harvest Caye, Belize, Norwegian Cruise Line
 Half Moon Cay or Little San Salvador Island, Bahamas, Holland America Line 
 Princess Cays, part of Eleuthera, Bahamas, Princess Cruises, bought in 1992
 Ocean Cay MSC Marine Reserve, Bahamas,  MSC Cruises
 Sir Bani Yas Island 'Beach Oasis' at Sir Bani Yas, Abu Dhabi, MSC Cruises

Real estate

The real estate market for private islands varies globally. Prices tend to be lower in Nova Scotia, parts of Michigan and Maine, and parts of Central America; and higher in Europe, the Bahamas, and Oceanic countries like French Polynesia. Islands with amenities have higher market value and are not sold as frequently. Some are available for travelers to rent, a trend which increased in the 2000s with economic recession making it more difficult for some owners to maintain them.

In the 2000s, the United States housing bubble increased the cost-per-acre for private islands. The effect was fueled by the advent of the Internet, which provided greater access to island inventories. Conservation groups' efforts to restrict development reduced the supply of private islands in the market, raising prices.

Southeast Asia has numerous islands, with Indonesia being an archipelago of 17,000 islands and the Philippines having around 7,100. Real estate laws restrict foreigners' ability to buy property in the geographical area, and many islands either have unclear ownership rights or are already settled. Private islands that are available in Southeast Asia's real estate market are also prohibitively costly due to being in high demand by hotel developers. Developments address these difficulties by selling private islands that have villas and neighbor islands that have high-end hotels; the proximity keeps costs of habitation down.

Europe has hundreds of thousands of islands, many of which are privately owned. With 17,000 islands in Finland, 221,831 islands in Sweden and thousands in Croatia, Europe is increasingly becoming a hotspot for private island holidays. Many islands, although privately owned, are not suitable for development due to legal and governmental restrictions or due to the physical characteristics of the island.

The Falkland Islands in the South Atlantic feature a number of private islands, typically run as sheep raising family farms and tourist destinations.

List of high-profile island owners                     
 Gianni Agnelli, Estate of – Dino Island off the Calabria  
 Pamela Anderson – Greece in The World, United Arab Emirates
 Bacardi family – near Grenada  
Amar Desai - Nova Scotia, Canada                                                                                                        
 Richard Branson – Necker Island & Moskito Island, British Virgin Islands; and Makepeace Island Australia.                                               
 Raymond Burr – Naitoumba, Fiji  
 Nicolas Cage – Leaf Cay, Bahamas
 Arnaud Henry Salas-Perez Prince Obolensky - Patroklos Island, Greece
 David Copperfield – Musha Cay, Bahamas
 Edward de Bono – Green Island – Australia, Tessera – Italy, Reklusia – Bahamas.           
 Johnny Depp – Little Hall's Pond Cay, Bahamas.  
 Leonardo DiCaprio – Blackadore Caye, Belize
 Celine Dion – Île Gagnon, Quebec.
 Larry Ellison – 98% of Lanai, one of the Hawaiian Islands.
 Jeffrey Epstein – Little Saint James, U.S. Virgin Islands until his death in 2019
 Disney family – Echo Island, San Juan Islands, Washington, US
 Du Pont family – Cherry Island, Chesapeake Bay, Maryland, US
 Errol Flynn – Navy Island, Port Antonio, Jamaica
 Mel Gibson – Mago Island, Fiji
 Bear Grylls – St. Tudwal's Island West, Wales, UK
 Gene Hackman – Fawn Island, San Juan Islands, Washington State, US
 Nick Hexum – Melody Key, Florida
 Faith Hill and Tim McGraw – Goat Cay, Exuma, Bahamas
 Jim Jannard - Kaibu Island & Vatu Vara Island, Fiji; and Spieden Island, San Juan Islands, Washington State, US
 Dean Kamen – North Dumpling Island, New York, US
 John Lennon – Dorinish Island in Clew Bay, County Mayo, Ireland
 Ricky Martin – Angra dos Reis, Brazil
 Dietrich Mateschitz – Laucala, Fiji
 Eddie Murphy – Rooster Cay, Bahamas
 Peter Nygård – Nygard Cay, Bahamas
 Aristotle Onassis – Skorpios Island, Greece
 Michael Ondaatje – Several islands, Mahone Bay, Nova Scotia, Canada 
 Roberto Ongpin – Balesin Island, in Polillo, Quezon, Philippines
 Baron Rothschild – Bell Island, Bahamas
 Ted Turner – St. Phillips Island, South Carolina, US
 Robin Williams – Pender Harbour, British Columbia, Canada

See also

 Desert island
 List of islands
 List of uninhabited regions
 Phantom island
 Principality of Sealand
 :Category:Uninhabited islands

References

 
Lists of islands